The Central Tower is an  office skyscraper that located near the Sükhbaatar Square in Ulaanbaatar, Mongolia. It was built in 2009 and has 17 floors. The building was designed by Dennis Lau & Ng Chun Man Architects & Engineers (HK) Ltd. (DLN) and developed by Shangri-La Ulaanbaatar Ltd. 

The building is rated as grade-A commercial office tower, which has high quality and service standards. It is occupied by several notable luxury goods companies, such as Louis Vuitton, Zegna, Hugo Boss, Montblanc, and Ulysse Nardin. The building is also used as the headquarters for Unitel, the country's tech company.

There is a Marco Polo statue in front of the building. It was built in 2011 by sculptor Denzen Barsbold.

See also
 International Commercial Center
 List of tallest buildings in Mongolia

References

Citations

Books
 

Buildings and structures in Ulaanbaatar